In the late 1990s, some journalists used the expression "New Great Game" to describe what they proposed was a renewed geopolitical interest in Central Asia based on the mineral wealth of the region. 

The name is a reference to the original Great Game, the term used by historians to describe the 19th-century political and diplomatic competition between the British and Russian empires for territory and influence among Central Asian states. The term "Great Game" itself had entered into more widespread use following the Soviet invasion of Afghanistan.

History

Continuation of Great Game or Second Great Game 
The "original" Great Game is traditionally seen as ending with the Anglo-Russian Convention of 1907, when the British and Russian Empires had formally defined their frontiers and ended their rivalry over Afghanistan, Persia, and Tibet. In 1987, Karl E. Meyer wrote that the Great Game continued after 1907, citing the Russian involvement in the Persian Constitutional Revolution supported by Britain. 

Some historians view events from the Russian Civil War and Soviet wars in Asia in the Interwar period, and categorize them as a continuation of the original Great Game, or as a second Great Game up to the mid-20th century. According to Morris, in a review of a history book by Meyer and Brysac,the Raj more or less bows out, the Tsar is removed and the Great Game is diffused into a miasmic free-for-all among the states. Now Americans, Germans, Chinese and Soviet Russians throw themselves into the power vacuum of Central Asia, to many theorists the heartland of the world, and riddled with symbolism.Historian David Noack writes that the Great Game resumed from 1919 to 1933 as a conflict between Britain and the Soviet Union, with the Weimar Republic and Japan as additional players. Noack calls it a "Second Tournament of Shadows" over the territory composing the border of British India, China, the Soviet Union and Japanese Manchuria. To Britain, the Germans appeared to be a secret Soviet ally. In 1933–1934 it "ended with Mongolia, Soviet Central Asia, Tannu-Tuva and Xinjiang isolated from non-Soviet influence." 

According to scholars Andrei Znamenski and  the Soviet Union continued elements of the Great Game into the 1930s, focused on secret diplomacy and espionage in Tibet and Mongolia. Agents in the new Soviet version included figures such as Agvan Dorzhiev, who had supported the Russian Empire previously. Historian Heather Campbell describes the continuation of elements of the Great Game by the British as well; Lord Curzon, a former viceroy of India who was concerned heavily with Russia strategy, would heavily influence policy in supporting the Tsarist Whites against the Soviet Union, as well as participating in the Sykes–Picot negotiations dividing the Middle East between Britain and France with the diplomatic support of Russia. Andreyev highlights that one of the original issues of the Great Game, a projected Russian invasion of India, was also revived by Trotsky with the planned Kalmyk Project.

Znamenski wrote that Soviet Communists of the 1920s aimed to extend their influence over Mongolia and Tibet, using the mythical Buddhist kingdom of Shambhala as a form of propaganda to further this mission, in a sort of "great Bolshevik game". The expedition of Russian symbolist Nicholas Roerich has been put in context of the Great Game due to his interest in Tibet, Although Roerich did not like the Communists, he agreed to help Soviet intelligence and influence operations due to a shared paranoia towards Britain, as well as his goal to form a "Sacred Union of the East" Jan Morris states that "Roerich brought the bewilderments of the later Great Game to America" through mysticism movements called Roerichism.

New Great Game 
In 1996, The New York Times published an opinion piece titled "The New Great Game in Asia" in which was written:

In 2004, journalist Lutz Kleveman wrote a book that linked the expression to the exploration of mineral wealth in the region. While the direct American military involvement in the area was part of fighting the "War on Terror" rather than an indirect Western governmental interest in the mineral wealth, another journalist Eric Walberg suggests in his book that access to the region's minerals and oil pipeline routes is still an important factor. The interest in oil and gas includes pipelines that transmit energy to China's east coast. One view of the New Great Game is a shift to geoeconomic compared to geopolitical competition. Xiangming Chen believes that China's role is more like Britain's than Russia's in the New Great Game, where Russia plays the role that the Russian Empire originally did. "China and Russia are the two dominant power players vs. the weaker independent Central Asian states".

Other authors have criticized the reuse of the term "Great Game". According to strategic analyst Ajay Patnaik, the "New Great Game" is a misnomer, because rather than two empires focused on the region as in the past, there are now many global and regional powers active with the rise of China and India as major economic powers. Central Asian states have diversified their political, economic, and security relationships. David Gosset of CEIBS Shanghai states "the Shanghai Cooperation Organization (SCO) established in 2001 is showing that Central Asia’s actors have gained some real degree of independence. But fundamentally, the China factor introduces a level of predictability " In the 2015 international relations book Globalizing Central Asia, the authors state that Central Asian states have pursued a multivectored approach in balancing out the political and economic interests of larger powers, but it has had mixed success due to strategic reversals of administrations regarding the West, China, and Russia. They suppose that China could counterbalance Russia. However, Russia and China have a strategic partnership since 2001. According to Ajay Patnaik, "China has advanced carefully in the region, using the SCO as the main regional mechanism, but never challenging Russian interests in Central Asia." In the Carnegie Endowment, Paul Stronski and Nicole Ng wrote in 2018 that China has not fundamentally challenged any Russian interests in Central Asia. They suggested that China, Russia, and the West could have mutual interests in regional stability in Central Asia. According to Paul Stronski and Nicole Ng, China uses its policy in Central Asia to "manage" Russia's concerns, satisfying Russia by showing China's economic aims do not threaten Russian political-military interests in the Russian Far East and elsewhere besides Central Asia, and assuaging Russia's demographic fears about Chinese immigration.

The historian James Reardon-Anderson stated in 2014, during the first withdrawal of U.S. troops in Afghanistan, that, "There may be a new Great Game in Central Asia, but it is going to have a lot less importance to the United States than the new Great Game in the Western Pacific and East Asian waters." In August 2021, Reuters reported that following the Taliban takeover, the "new Great Game has Pakistan in control" of Afghanistan and also involves India and China. In Nikkei, writer and retired Admiral James Stavridis stated that the "new Great Game" involves Russia's interest in the regulation of opium production, China's interest in rare earth minerals, a growing role for India, while the West will be reluctant to enter. Following the 2021 U.S. withdrawal from Afghanistan, RFE/RL reported that "Russia, China, Pakistan, and Iran could come together in the next chapter of the Great Game," or "Moscow, Beijing, Islamabad, and Tehran are each merely looking to advance their own interests in the new geopolitical order." 

In a 2020 study, the New Great Game was described as a form of "Civilizational Colonialism" in border regions and areas of territorial disputes, united by their location in High Asia or "The Roof of the World". Kashmir, Hazara, Nuristan, Laghman, Azad Kashmir, Jammu, Himachal Pradesh, Ladakh, Gilgit Baltistan, Chitral, Western Tibet, Western Xinjiang, Badakhshan, Gorno Badakhshan, Fergana, Osh and Turkistan Region. These rich resource areas are surrounded by the five major mountainous systems of Tien Shan, Pamirs, Karakoram, Hindu Kush and Western Himalayas and the three main river systems of Amu Darya, Syr Darya and Indus.

The "Great Game" as a term has been described as a cliché-metaphor, and there are authors who have now written on the topics of "The Great Game" in Antarctica, the world's far north, and in outer space.

See also

 Anglo-Soviet invasion of Iran 
 Cold War
 Geostrategy in Central Asia 
 The Great Game
 The Great Game (Hopkirk book)
 Iran–United Kingdom relations 
 Russia–United Kingdom relations
 Strategic geography
 Western imperialism in Asia

References

Sources

Further reading

The timeline of the Great Game online .

New Great Game
Great Game
1990s in Asia
2000s in Asia
Geopolitical rivalry
History of Central Asia
Modern history of Afghanistan
Modern history of Pakistan
1990s in Afghanistan
1990s in India
1990s in Pakistan
2000s in Afghanistan
2000s in India
2000s in Pakistan
Great Game, New
Great Game, New
Great Game, New
Great Game, New
Great Game, New
Great Game, New
Great Game, New
Great Game, New
Great Game, New
Great Game, New
Great Game, New
Great Game, New
Great Game, New
Great Game, New
Great Game, New
Great Game, New
Cold War
Soviet–Afghan War
Afghanistan conflict (1978–present)